White ibis may refer to several birds:
 American white ibis, Eudocimus albus
 Australian white ibis, Threskiornis molucca
Solomons white ibis or Solomon Islands white ibis, Threskiornis (molucca) pygmaeus
 Asiatic white ibis, an alternative name for the black-headed ibis, Threskiornis melanocephala

See also
Ibis (disambiguation)

Bird common names